Mycosphaerella lageniformis is a fungal plant pathogen.

See also
 List of Mycosphaerella species

References

lageniformis
Fungal plant pathogens and diseases
Fungi described in 1911